The Afrotainment family of channels is a New York-based network of nine linear television channels and digital properties (AFRO, Afrotainment, Afrotainment Music, Afro Sports, ABO, OUI TV, TV9JA, HAITI HD, YEBO) broadcasting Afro-Centric content in North America. Afrotainment family channels are available on Comcast, DISH Network, Altice USA, Verizon FIOS, Frontier Communications, Bell Fibe, Videotron, Roku, Amazon Fire TV and Apple TV.

History 
Afrotainment was created in 2005 by Yves Bollanga, a former IBM Software Engineer and Shafquat Chaudhary  Afrotainment, besides being a company involved in TV transmission, is also a TV production company that creates Afrocentric content: films, scripted and unscripted content, talk-shows, late night comedies, among others. On June 22, 2005, Afrotainment launched 3A TELESUD its first channel on DISH Network. Initial launch on DISH Network was followed by 3 more carriage agreement between 2008 and 2011 for the following TV channels: Afrotainment Movies, Afrotainment Music, TV9JA and OUI TVOn October 13, 2011, Afrotainment Launched its first channel on Cable: Afrotainment Plus, which includes the best of all Afrotainment programming, which includes African movies, Series, reality shows, talk shows, and highly coveted African soccer. Afrotainment Plus is available on IO Africa offering on Channel 1101On September 19, 2013, Afrotainment launched 4 new channels in Canada on Bell Fibe TV.  This agreement marks its first expansion outside of the United States. On December 5, 2014, Afrotainment launched Haiti HD a network targeting the Haitian community on Bell Fibe TV Canada. In August 2015, Afrotainment launched YEBO, an OTT music video on demand app on Amazon Fire TV, Roku, Apple TV. On March 3, 2016, Afrotainment launched 2 channels (AFRO and ABO) on Verizon FIOS. On October 30, 2016, Afrotainment launched Haiti HD on Videotron in Canada. On June 28, 2017, Afrotainment launched AFRO, its Polycultural Black channel on Sling TV in the Lifestyle Plus package. The channel was removed on June 26, 2019. On November 15, 2018, Comcast announced an agreement to launch AFRO on Xfinity.

Programming 
Afrotainment airs films and TV series from the African and Black worldwide diaspora. Afrotainment also produces several hours of content from its Orlando TV Studios: Point of View, a daytime woman talk show; Afrotainers, an Entertainment News show, Afrohits Top 10, a chart of the ten best Afro-centric music videos, The Lowdown, a late night comedy show, Journey, an interview-like talk show. The network also broadcasts soccer matches of the Confederation of African Football such as the CAF Champions League, CAF Confederation Cup, CAF African Nation Championship, and CAF Youth Championship.

Channels
Soundview Africa currently owns and operates the following 8 TV channels:

AFRO TV – Polycultural Black Television channel.

Afrotainment – Afro-centric general entertainment service, broadcasting in High-definition; programming includes TV series, films, talk shows and reality series.

Afrotainment Plus – Cable centric service featuring the best programming from Afrotainment & Afrotainment Music.

Afrotainment Music – Afro-centric music service featuring music from the African continent.  Programming includes music videos, live performances and entertainment programs.

Africa Box Office (ABO) – Afro-centric movie service featuring the best in film from the African continent.  It airs over 100 new movies every year from Nollywood and other movie houses throughout Africa.

TV Naija – General entertainment service aimed at Nigerian community, airs TV series & music from Nigeria.

Oui TV – Cameroonian, Ivorian and African sitcoms and dramas in French.

YEBO – Afro-caribbean music video on Demand (Apple TV, Amazon Fire, Roku).

Events 
Every September the cream of the African music industry gathers at an Afro-glam red carpet event at the Afrotainment Studio in New York to recognize African talent as award winners are announced and celebrated. The Afrotainment Museke Online Africa Music Awards is multicasted Live on the Afrotainment family of channels nationwide in the US and also viewable online.

References

External links
 Afrotainment official site
 AFRO web site
 Africa Box Office
 Optimum Cablevision
 DISH Network

2011 establishments in New York (state)
African culture in New York (state)
Nigerian-American culture and history
Television channels and stations established in 2011
Television stations in New York City